The 1987 James Hardie 1000 was an endurance race for Group A Touring Cars, staged on 4 October 1987 at the Mount Panorama Circuit, near Bathurst, in New South Wales, Australia. The race was the eighth round of the inaugural World Touring Car Championship, and was the 28th in a sequence of Bathurst 1000 races, commencing with the 1960 Armstrong 500 held at Phillip Island.

The race was shortened from 163 laps to 161 for 1987, when the track was slightly lengthened by the addition of the Caltex Chase, a chicane which was built in response to the death of Mike Burgmann in an accident during the previous year's race.

The addition of The Chase saw lap times increase by approximately 4–5 seconds over those in 1986. The Chase was also meant to slow the cars down, but the speed of the new breed of Group A cars (specifically the turbocharged Ford Sierra RS500), saw the fastest cars (Eggenberger Motorsport) reaching higher speeds on the shortened straight than had been achieved on the full length straight in 1986 (the fastest car on the full straight in 1986, the Holden VK Commodore SS Group A, was recorded at ). The straight line speed of the new Sierras was comparable to those the Australian Group C cars were reaching by 1984.

The 1987 race was provisionally won by the Ford-supported Eggenberger Motorsport team, with Steve Soper and Pierre Dieudonné taking the chequered flag in their Ford Sierra RS500, two laps ahead of teammates Klaus Ludwig and Klaus Niedzwiedz. Third was the best of the locally based teams, the HDT Racing entered Holden VL Commodore SS Group A driven by Peter McLeod, Peter Brock and David Parsons.

Protests lodged before the race significantly affected the official results, which were not finalised until well into 1988. The two Eggenberger cars were disqualified for illegally modified front wheel arch guards, which allowed the cars to race on taller tires. The team appealed their disqualification as far as the appeals process allowed, the FIA's court of appeal. Eventually the disqualifications were upheld and McLeod, Brock and Parsons were declared race winners. It was a record ninth Bathurst 1000 victory for Brock and his final victory in the race. For McLeod and Parsons it would be their only win at Bathurst. McLeod's nominated co-driver Jon Crooke failed to get a start after the Brock/Parsons car failed on lap 34 and the pair moved into the team's second car. McLeod had been a last-minute draftee into the team as Crooke's Sandown 500 co-driver Neil Crompton was unable to get his racing licence upgraded in time for the race. The disqualifications saw the factory Nissan team promoted into a second and third team result, which would remain the best ever performance by a Japanese manufacturer until Nissan's first win in 1991. It was the first time the winner of this event had not led one lap of the race.  It was only the second time that the winner of this event did not complete the full race distance (the first being Dick Johnson's 1981 victory, where he completed 747 kilometres before the red flag was shown to end the race).

The winning #10 HDT Commodore started the race in 20th position with a time of 2:25.12 set by Peter Brock. Brock had also qualified his own #05 Commodore in 11th place. As Brock had already qualified his own car his time should not have counted as the fastest qualifying time for car #10. Had the stewards of the meeting followed procedure, the McLeod/Crooke Commodore should have started from 27th on the basis of Jon Crooke's time of 2:27.00 (McLeod's best time the car was a 2:27.96). A similar situation had occurred for the HDT in 1986 following Allan Moffat's crash in the 05 Commodore. Brock had then qualified the team's second car with a time that was good enough for second place (faster than his own car), but his time did not count towards a grid placing.

Subsequently, when the wheel arches of the Sierras were declared illegal during practice for the final round at Fuji in Japan. The Texaco team then made them legal before qualifying and the West German pairing of Ludwig and Niedzwiedz went on to win the race.

Class 2 provided a 1-2 result for the Australian-based JPS Team BMW, with the BMW M3 of Jim Richards and Tony Longhurst leading home the similar car of teammates Robbie Francevic and the team's engine builder Ludwig Finauer. In third place was the first of the BMW Motorsport entered BMW M3s, the CiBiEmme car of Johnny Cecotto and Gianfranco Brancatelli. The CiBiEmme BMW was the leading registered World Touring Car Championship entry, its seventh outright placing matching the result achieved by the best placed WTCC-registered entry in the season opening Monza 500. These two results stood as the equal lowest race placings by the top finishing registered entry at any round of the 1987 championship (both the Monza and Bathurst races had seen the original winning teams disqualified).

Class 3 had only one finisher (finishing 23rd and last outright), the Bob Holden Motors Toyota Sprinter driven by 1966 Gallaher 500 winner Bob Holden and his co-drivers Garry Willmington and Bryan Bate. At the time that both of the Team Toyota Australia cars that were leading the class crashed out on the top of The Mountain, Bob Holden's car was some 20 laps behind having had numerous early problems.

One record that was set in the race was its youngest ever driver. Graham Gulson, the 17-year-old son of long-time touring car driver and Bathurst regular Ray Gulson, made his mountain debut alongside his father in the teams ex-JPS Team BMW 635 CSi. Graham easily qualified for the race and acquitted himself well in illustrious company during his one stint at the wheel in the race. The Gulson family BMW finished 15th outright and 10th in class, completing 146 laps to be 12 laps down at the finish.

Due to the number of laps behind the safety car and the rain which slowed lap times by approximately 20 seconds, the race lasted for 7:01:08.40. This was the first event since the rain affected 1974 race that the race took more than 7 hours to be completed.  The time was calculated on when the first of the disqualified Sierras crossed the line.

Classes
Cars competed in three classes conforming to World Touring Car Championship regulations:

Class 1
The outright category was for cars with an engine capacity over 2500cc. The class consisted of BMW 635 CSi, Ford Sierra RS500, Holden Commodore, Maserati Biturbo, Mitsubishi Starion, Nissan Skyline and Toyota Supra.

Class 2
The middle class was for cars with an engine capacity from 1601 to 2500cc. The class consisted of Alfa Romeo 75, BMW M3, Mercedes-Benz 190E and Nissan Gazelle.

Class 3
The baby car class was for cars with an engine capacity from 1001 to 1600cc. It consisted of a variety of Toyota Corollas and a single Alfa Romeo 33.

Hardies Heroes
The Top 10 runoff for pole position was a one off event in the World Touring Car Championship. FISA initially objected to it but were ultimately powerless to stop it as it was written into the race regulations by the event promoters, the Australian Racing Driver's Club (ARDC).

* Three time 24 Hours of Le Mans winner Klaus Ludwig became the first Bathurst Rookie to take pole position for the race. With the addition of the new "Caltex Chase" complex on Conrod straight, lap times were around 4–5 seconds slower in 1987 than before. The general feeling was that Ludwig's pole time would have been even faster than George Fury's record 1984 pole time of 2:13.85 had the Chase not been there.* 1987 was Ford's first pole position at Bathurst since Allan Moffat claimed pole in his XB Falcon in 1976. It was also Ford's first front row start at Bathurst since Dick Johnson started second in 1981 in an XD Falcon, and the first time that Ford outnumbered other makes in the shootout.* With Ludwig on pole and Andy Rouse second, 1987 was the first time in race history that two Bathurst rookies had occupied the front row of the grid since qualifying times first counted for grid positions in 1967, though Rouse had been previously entered in 1976 but did not arrive, and one of his co-drivers was four time Great Race winner Allan Moffat, who was having his first race in a Ford since 1980.* The two Dick Johnson Racing Sierras of Dick Johnson and Charlie O'Brien were had their times disallowed after failing a fuel check following the shootout. The team had mistakenly used fuel churns that had been filled at the team base in Brisbane and not at the track. It was of an inferior grade and actually made the engines produce less power than normal, but the penalty stood.* Dick Johnson was contesting his tenth consecutive Hardie's Heroes, being the only driver to have contested each one since its inception in 1978.* The #12 Texaco Sierra driven by Klaus Niedzwiedz was withdrawn from the race following the shootout, with Niedzwiedz being Ludwig's nominated co-driver in the #7 Sierra. All qualified cars behind then moved up one place on the grid.* 1987 was the first Hardies Heroes that Peter Brock failed to qualify for after qualifying twelfth. He did not appear in the 1986 shootout due to the car still being repaired following Allan Moffat's Friday crash, but Brock had qualified second before the crash.* Giving lie to the myth that you had to be a Bathurst regular to go fast on The Mountain, 5 European based drivers qualified for the shootout. Klaus Ludwig, Andy Rouse, Steve Soper, Klaus Niedzwiedz (the top 4) and Johnny Cecotto. Only Soper (1984) and 1985 Rookie of the Year Cecotto had previously raced at Bathurst.

Official results
Sourced from:

Italics indicate driver practiced this car but did not race.

Statistics
 Provisional Pole Position - #7 Klaus Ludwig - 2:17.46
 Pole Position - #7 Klaus Ludwig - 2.16.969
 Fastest Lap - #35 Andrew Miedecke - 2:22.50 - Lap 19 (new lap record)
 Average Speed - 140 km/h
 Race Time - 7:01:08.40 (based upon when Car 6 crossed the line).

See also
1987 World Touring Car Championship
1987 Australian Touring Car season

References

External links
 CAMS Manual reference to Australian titles
 www.touringcarracing.net
 race results

Motorsport in Bathurst, New South Wales
James Hardie 1000
James Hardie 1000